Our Lady of Mercy College (OLMC), is a Roman Catholic, secondary day school for girls, situated in Heidelberg, a north-eastern suburb of Melbourne, Victoria, Australia.

The college is conducted by the Sisters of Mercy, a congregation of religious Sisters founded in Dublin, Ireland, by Catherine McAuley.

OLMC is a member of Girls Sport Victoria (GSV) and the Catholic All Schools Sports Association (CAS).

OLMC is split into four houses, Loreto, Carmel, Mercy and McAuley. These four houses compete in swimming, athletics, debating arts and maths competitions.

Sport 
OLMC is a member of Girls Sport Victoria (GSV).

GSV premierships 
OLMC has won the following GSV premierships.

 Basketball (9) - 2004, 2006, 2008, 2010, 2013, 2014, 2016, 2017, 2018
 Netball (2) - 2003, 2004
 Soccer (3) - 2011, 2012, 2016
 Softball - 2016
 Tennis (2) - 2001, 2016
 Volleyball - 2005

Notable alumnae
 Susan Crennan - former justice of the High Court of Australia
 Alannah MacTiernan - former politician
 Emma Alberici - European correspondent for The 7.30 Report
 Sarah Abo - Journalist, 60 Minutes (Australian TV program)

See also 
 List of schools in Victoria
 Victorian Certificate of Education

References

External links
Our Lady of Mercy College School Website

Girls' schools in Victoria (Australia)
Heidelberg, Victoria
Catholic secondary schools in Melbourne
Educational institutions established in 1910
1910 establishments in Australia
Sisters of Mercy schools
Alliance of Girls' Schools Australasia
Buildings and structures in the City of Banyule